Let's Be Still is the second studio album by American band The Head and the Heart, following the 2011 release of their self-entitled first album. It was officially released on October 15, 2013. Two months prior to this release, track six on the album, "Shake" was released as a single in late July 2013. The band also gave a performance of the second track, "Another Story" on Late Night with Jimmy Fallon on August 6, 2013. The band has scheduled a Fall of 2013 tour following the release of Let's Be Still.

Track listing

Personnel
Charity Rose Thielen - vocals, percussion, violin, etc.
Josiah Johnson - vocals, guitar, percussion, etc.
Jonathan Russell - vocals, guitar, percussion, etc.
Tyler Williams - drums, percussion, etc.
Chris Zasche - bass
Kenny Hensley - keyboards, etc.

Additional Musicians
Peter Katis - additional instruments
Kit Karlson - piano and organ on These Days Are Numbered

Commercial performance 
Let's Be Still debuted at number 10 with 42,000 copies sold on Billboard 200. As of July 29, 2016, it has sold 201,000 copies to date.

Charts

References

External links
 

2013 albums
Sub Pop albums
The Head and the Heart albums